Vincent is a ghost town in Valley Township, Osborne County, Kansas, United States.

History
A post office was opened in Vincent in 1878, and remained in operation until it was discontinued in 1901.

References

Unincorporated communities in Osborne County, Kansas
Unincorporated communities in Kansas